Cletus Cortland Kasady is a supervillain appearing in American comic books published by Marvel Comics. Created by writer David Michelinie and artist Erik Larsen, the character first appeared in The Amazing Spider-Man #344 (March 1991) as the first and most infamous host of the Carnage symbiote, an offspring of Venom. Originally a deranged serial killer, Kasady bonded with the symbiote while sharing a cell with Venom's human host, Eddie Brock, and broke out of prison using the super-human abilities granted by it. Since then, he went on to menace both Venom and Spider-Man, resulting in various unlikely alliances between the two to defeat him. Kasady and Carnage are a perfect match, as they both have sadistic personalities, and the symbiote only increases Kasady's already existent violent tendencies. After being separated from the redeemed Carnage symbiote in Absolute Carnage, Cassidy nonetheless continued calling himself Carnage, bonding with Grendel, Mania and several other symbiotes to become Dark Carnage.

Since his original introduction in comics, the character has been adapted into several other forms of media, such as television series and video games. Woody Harrelson portrays Cletus Kasady / Carnage in the live-action Sony's Spider-Man Universe films Venom (2018) and Venom: Let There Be Carnage (2021). In 2009, the Cletus Kasady version of Carnage was ranked as IGN's 90th Greatest Comic Book Villain of All Time.

Publication history 
Writer David Michelinie intended to have Venom's human alter ego, Eddie Brock, be killed off in The Amazing Spider-Man #400 and have the symbiote continue to bond with a series of hosts. However, as Brock and Venom's popularity increased, Marvel would not allow him to be killed. Michelinie decided to create a new character: a total psychopath who, unlike Venom, had no sense of morality. The human component of Carnage's first host, Cletus Kasady, was designed by artist Erik Larsen, who modeled the character after the DC Comics supervillain the Joker.

Kasady was introduced in The Amazing Spider-Man #344 and first appears as Carnage in issue #361. As the host of the Carnage symbiote, he is the main villain in the 1993 "Maximum Carnage" crossover, a 14-part storyline crossover that spanned through all the Spider-Man titles. In 1996, two one-shot comics centered entirely around Carnage were released, entitled Carnage: Mind Bomb and Carnage: It's a Wonderful Life, both of which expand on his character.

After a 2004 appearance in New Avengers the character was presumed dead and was absent from comics for nearly six years. A 2010–2011 limited series titled Carnage featured the return of Kasady as Carnage. The comic was released as a tie-in to the "Big Time" storyline in The Amazing Spider-Man. This was followed by another five-issue limited series titled Carnage U.S.A. and published 2011–2012. Carnage was next seen in the 2012 "Minimum Carnage" crossover storyline between Scarlet Spider vol. 2, Venom vol. 2, and two one-shots titled Minimum Carnage Alpha and Minimum Carnage Omega. The character crosses over with the Superior Spider-Man in the 2013 five-issue limited series called Superior Carnage written by Kevin Shinick.

A new Carnage series, starting in November 2015, as part of Marvel's post-Secret Wars relaunch, was written by Gerry Conway and Mike Perkins.

Fictional character biography

Early life 
Kasady is a psychopath and a homicidal sadist. He is a deeply disturbed individual with a dark past: he was born in a psychiatric prison at Ravencroft, where his heart stopped for a few minutes until he was revived by Knull to be the one to free Knull from Klyntar. As a child, he killed his grandmother by pushing her down a flight of stairs, tried to murder his mother by dropping a hairdryer into her bathtub, and tortured and killed his mother's dog with a drill. His mother then tried to kill Kasady and was apparently beaten to the brink of death by Kasady's father, who received no defense from Kasady during the trial. As an orphan, Kasady was sent to the St. Estes Home for Boys, where his antisocial behavior made him the target of abuse from both the other orphans and the staff. Kasady gained revenge by murdering the disciplinarian administrator, pushing a girl (who laughed at him for asking to date her) in front of a moving bus, and burning down the orphanage. It was during his brutal years at St. Estes that Kasady acquired his philosophy that life was essentially meaningless and futile, that "laws are only words", and came to see the spreading of chaos through random, unpatterned bloodshed as "the ultimate freedom" and thinking that he was actually "freeing" people.

Rebirth 
Kasady became a serial killer, convicted of 11 murders though he bragged of a dozen more victims. He was then captured and sent to Ryker's Island prison, where he shared a cell with Eddie Brock, the host of the alien symbiote that turns Brock into the supervillain Venom. When Brock's symbiote soon returned to be bonded again, allowing Venom to escape prison, the symbiote unknowingly left its offspring in the cell; due to its alien instincts, the symbiote felt no emotional attachment to its offspring, regarding it as insignificant, and thus never communicated its existence to Brock via their telepathic link. The new symbiote then bonded with Kasady, transforming him into Carnage. The bond between the Carnage symbiote and Kasady was stronger than the bond between Brock and the Venom symbiote. As a result, Carnage is far more violent, powerful, and deadly than Venom. He escaped prison, and began a series of murders, and at the scene of each crime, wrote "Carnage" on the walls with his own blood. He was found by Spider-Man, though the hero proved to be no match for Carnage's powers. In desperation, Spider-Man made a truce with Venom to fight Carnage. The Carnage symbiote was defeated and apparently destroyed with sonic weaponry, but unbeknownst to them the symbiote's deeper equilibrium with its host helped to save it. After entering Kasady's body through a small cut, it bonded to his blood (which caused its red coloration).

Maximum Carnage 

Kasady is taken to the Vault, a prison for super-villains—then Ravencroft Institute, a facility for the super-human criminally insane. A doctor at the facility, hoping to find a "cure" for his madness, draws blood from him — unwittingly enabling Kasady to transform into Carnage—who goes on to recruit an army of psychopathic supervillains including Shriek, Demogoblin, Carrion, and Doppelganger to take over New York City. Using Shriek's "psychic channel" powers, he also drives ordinary New Yorkers to attack one another. Carnage and his "family" are ultimately driven back by Spider-Man, Venom and a number of other superheroes and super-antiheroes, with Carnage and Shriek being remanded to Ravencroft.

Web of Carnage 
During a subsequent jailbreak he made it his mission to kill his only childhood friend, Billy Bentime, hoping to refute the notion that friendship should be paid in kind. Carnage nearly defeated Spider-Man until Bentime tricked Carnage into reverting to human form enabling Spider-Man to knock out Kasady with a simple punch.

Though bonded to Kasady's bloodstream the symbiote found a way to ditch its host by travelling through the institute's water pipes, its absence leaving Kasady increasingly weakened, initially taking control of John Jameson before it eventually transferred itself to Spider-Man (currently Ben Reilly). Reilly attempted to destroy the symbiote by subjecting himself to a potentially lethal burst of microwave energy, but the symbiote fled back to the weakening Kasady.

Later, Kasady was able to escape his prison when a new governor at Ravencroft decided to try and save money by turning off some of the defenses around Kasady's cell, underestimating the level of awareness the symbiote had of its surroundings. During this escape, it was confronted by Spider-Man and the Silver Surfer. The symbiote — driven to panic due to genetic memories of Galactus devouring a planet of symbiotes — parted from Kasady and bonded to the Surfer to stop him while Spider-Man was forced to take Kasady to the hospital. Learning that the killer was dying of a stomach tumor that had been kept in check by the symbiote, Spider-Man was forced to help the Surfer return the symbiote to Kasady to save his life, but the Surfer then sealed Kasady in an unbreakable prison in an attempt to force him to reflect on his sins for eternity.

Death and resurrection 
Having tracked Kasady to a prison specially designed to hold him — how he escaped Silver Surfer's prison was never established — Venom eventually reabsorbs the Carnage symbiote into his own body "for good". Without the symbiote, Kasady attempts to re-assume the Carnage persona by costuming himself in red paint and continuing his killing sprees, claiming that he still possesses at least some of Carnage's strength and convinced that he only needs to kill Spider-Man and Venom to regain his symbiote, but Spider-Man nevertheless easily defeats him in a fight. Kasady later ended in the Negative Zone, where he was guided by a strange voice to another symbiote that was kept sealed somewhere in the Zone. As Cletus bonded with it, the mysterious voice reveals itself to be the remnants of the Carnage symbiote, which absorbed the symbiote to regenerate itself and become Carnage once again.

Breakout 
Carnage is one of several supervillains trying to escape from the Raft. Sentry flies Carnage outside the Earth's atmosphere and rips him in two.

Family Feud 
It is revealed that Kasady is alive (although both of his legs have been severed), his body preserved by the symbiote and repaired by Hall's prosthetics. Kasady reclaims the symbiote and becomes Carnage once more, attempting to avenge his captivity while Spider-Man and Iron Man struggle to stop him. It is then revealed that Carnage is once again pregnant, and the suit's spawn briefly bonds to Shriek before being torn from her. Scared of Shriek's malice, the symbiote arm then bonds to Tanis, creating a new hero, Scorn, who defeats Shriek and forces her to use her sonic shriek to weaken Carnage for Spider-Man and Iron Man. Carnage, however, escapes with the Doppelganger and swears to make a bloody comeback.

Carnage USA 
In the aftermath of his return, Carnage sets off west to Doverton, Colorado. He bonds most of the town to copies of his symbiote. Captain America, Spider-Man, Wolverine, Hawkeye, and the Thing attempt to defeat him but all except Spider-Man are bonded to copies. With the Avengers team compromised and Spider-Man out of communication, they send in another team consisted of symbiote-enhanced special forces. Dr. Tanis Nieves as Scorn goes along with the separated parts of Hybrid which make up Agony, Phage, Riot, and Lasher, but they are heavily outnumbered since Carnage controls the entire town. Captain America breaks free of his hold long enough to make an emergency call for backup to none other than Venom. Flash Thompson in the Venom symbiote sets off to Colorado to kill Carnage. The enhanced special forces keep fighting but Carnage sends the controlled Avengers after them, that was when Spider-Man comes with the unaffected residents of the town. The melee is particularly fierce when Venom intervenes with sonic rounds. Venom is about to kill Carnage with a gun in the mouth but Spider-Man stops him. Before Venom or Carnage can recover, Scorn uses a construction vehicle to carry the two to a device she built. She reveals that her device is meant to permanently remove the bonds from Carnage and Venom, but the hosts are still in there, leaving Kasady alone with a legless Flash Thompson. After the symbiotes fighting with themselves and the Avengers team, Venom finds its way back to Flash Thompson while Scorn is able to capture and contain the Carnage symbiote. The series ends with Kasady being captured and dragged into the back of a prison vehicle.

Minimum Carnage 
Carnage escapes prison yet again with the help of microns. Agent Venom is sent to the prison and discovers Kasady has escaped. Carnage flees to Houston, Texas, and causes havoc, attracting the attention of the Scarlet Spider. Carnage takes the scientist Dr. Ketola, an expert in inter-dimensional transportation, as a hostage and escapes into the Microverse. He is defeated by Venom and Scarlet Spider, who use a sonic bomb from the Microverse to temporarily separate Kasady from the symbiote. Scarlet Spider then impales Kasady through the eye, lobotomizing him. Carnage goes into a catatonic state: the symbiote is keeping his body alive, similar to a life-support system, but Kasady's brain and mind are believed to be irreparably damaged, leaving the symbiote in control.

Superior Carnage 
Kasady, now lobotomized, was later broken out of prison by the Wizard and Klaw, who intend to recruit him into the Frightful Four and turn him into their own version of Venom. Carnage breaks free from Wizard's control and nearly kills him, but is subdued by Klaw. Taking Carnage into their hideout, Wizard tries to take control of Kasady's mind but fails due to it being too damaged. Wizard then transfers the Symbiote to Dr. Karl Malus who dubs himself "Superior Carnage".

Wizard blows up the hideout with Kasady still inside, seemingly killing him. While storming the city hall, Superior Carnage states that Kasady was a fool who wasted so much time on chaos while there was much more to be accomplished with a little focus.

Ultimately, Spider-Man brings out Kasady's body to successfully draw the symbiote into it, which immediately devours Dr. Malus and then prepares to finish off the Wizard. However, Klaw's ephemeral spirit focuses his sound manipulation powers one last time for a split second to create a powerful sonic blast that disables Carnage, allowing the symbiote to be recaptured. In the epilogue, it is shown that the symbiote has managed to repair the Wizard's and Kasady's brain damage, followed by Kasady writing "CARNAGE RULES" on his cell wall.

A piece of the symbiote (which had died in captivity) escapes containment and sets out in search of Kasady, who is bedridden due to having been stabbed by a fellow prison inmate. A doctor, anticipating that the symbiote will come seeking Kasady, smothers the killer in the infirmary, wanting the alien for himself. When the symbiote breaks into the facility, the doctor offers himself to the creature, but it rejects him and returns to Kasady after resuscitating him. Carnage proceeds to asphyxiate the doctor, rampage through the prison, and escape.

AXIS 
During the 2014 "AXIS" storyline, Magneto starts to recruit villains in order to combat the Red Onslaught. He manages to convince Carnage by saying he'll cause more chaos by becoming a savior and so Carnage agrees. When he sees Deadpool he tells him that they are "going to have words after this".

During the battle with Red Onslaught, Doctor Doom and the Scarlet Witch cast a spell which alters the moralities of almost everyone present, Carnage included. Filled with the irresistible urge to be a hero, Carnage returns to New York and goes around "saving" people, largely oblivious to the fact that he is causing more harm than good. This is proven when Spider-Man finds that Carnage had saved a family from Squid and his gang, the Tentacles. At the same time, a new Sin-Eater is murdering journalists, which unscrupulous reporter Alice Gleason uses to try and boost her popularity by feigning severe distress over the killings. Believing Alice's crocodile tears and convinced that she is a kindhearted and empathic person, Carnage rescues her from Sin-Eater and abducts her with the intent of having Alice teach him how to be "a great hero". However, after Carnage defeats Sin-Eater by overloading his foe with all his old sins, Alice turns on Carnage and convinces the police that he has been attacking her, but the inverted Carnage simply concludes that she is teaching him that a true hero must be alone to protect others and swings away.

Faced with the threat of the morally inverted Avengers seeking to enforce their power and the inverted X-Men working with Apocalypse to take control of Manhattan, Spider-Man and the aged Steve Rogers are forced to work with Magneto and the "Astonishing Avengers" of Carnage and the other inverted villains. Although unable to destroy the X-Men's gene-bomb, which would have killed all humans in the blast radius, Carnage sacrifices himself to contain the blast with his own symbiote, Spider-Man describing Kasady's sacrifice as the worst man he ever knew doing the noblest thing he'd ever seen. With the crisis concluded, Peter Parker sets out to create a gold-and-rhinestone memorial to Carnage as he promised Kasady he would before his sacrifice. After the heroes and villains are inverted, a videotape is released in which the Astonishing Avengers — with Carnage as their "spokesman" — proclaim themselves to be the "Axis of Evil", taking responsibility for the Avengers' and the X-Men's actions during the inversion at the cost of their own brief time as heroes.

Post-AXIS 
Kasady is revealed to have cheated death again, though he lost the lower half of his body in the process, and went to Carefree, Arizona, to pay a visit to a new friend he made during the time he was inverted, a friend he was willing to "help", Sam Alexander aka Nova. Kasady left a message signaling his return in the form of murdering a random bystander who he had asked where to find the boy as proof that he was reverted to his more natural moral axis.

After learning that Sam's mother works at a local diner, Kasady took her hostage there in order to get his attention, but, tired of waiting, Kasady decided to kill her. Nova arrived before he could do so and took him away from the diner to an empty area in order not to hurt anyone. While fighting, Nova tried to convince him that he was not Sam Alexander, but the maniac did not believe him. After being wounded by the Nova Force, Kasady fled in order to let his symbiote heal him as the police arrived. In the next day, already healed from his burns, Kasady attacked Sam again, this time at his school.

While attacking Sam at school, Carnage saw Nova flying around the area, thus making it impossible for the boy to be Nova (unbeknownst to him, that was Sam's mother wearing his helmet). Enraged, Carnage followed the false Nova, but lost sight of her. He then started to attack innocent people to try to get Nova's attention, which he got. A new battle ensued between them both. Carnage was taken by Nova to the sky and then punched him into the parking lot below, the impact setting off the cars' alarms, dizzying Kasady, and his symbiote. Kasady was then thrown by Nova, who had already realized Carnage's weakness to high sounds, into an Anthrax (a heavy metal band which Kasady was a fan of) show nearby. As the symbiote screamed in pain, Kasady fled from there to the road but was attacked by Nova again. He threw a car at Nova, who caught it midair, and took advantage of it to punch him. Ready to finish off his opponent, Carnage was hit by a truck. He was then tied in metal plates by Nova and left by his symbiote as he revealed he wanted to kill Nova because he wanted to erase any memory of his good deeds, from the time he had his moral axis inverted, from anyone who remembered it. He was left by Sam in Ryker's Island.

Carnage solo series 
When Cletus escaped, as usual, he found out that one woman had survived one of his first slaughters. Enraged he went after her only to find out that it was a trap orchestrated by the FBI agent Claire Dixon, John Jameson as Man-Wolf and Eddie Brock as Toxin. They started to battle, but the mine they were in started to crumble. He suddenly met a cult who worships Chthon and told him that he is part of the Darkhold prophecy and spilled his blood on the book giving Carnage new supernatural powers.

After that Carnage hijacked a boat, so he could resurrect Chthon and be rewarded. When Claire's team got to the boat, she got abducted by Carnage and he bonded her to his third offspring calling herself Raze. Then the team tried to kill Carnage by exploding the boat. Then Cletus got by a young girl named Jubil van Scotter, not knowing who he was. He tried to infect her with his symbiote, but she proved to be immune to him and she exploded her boat to get rid of Carnage and then she got saved by the team.

Carnage survived and went to the island where he could resurrect Chthon. The team along with Jubil went to the island and found countless dead bodies. Then Carnage finally resurrects Chthon, only to pushed aside by him. Since Jubil had a piece of the power from Carnage, Eddie Brock gave his Toxin symbiote to her and absorbed the Raze symbiote from Claire. She with the symbiote took the form of an Angelic Knight and defeated Chthon, resulting in the apparent death of Toxin. Carnage now furious, tried to kill the team, until Claire who got rid of her symbiote, sacrificed herself to save the others. Then the team used the Darkhold against Carnage by separating the symbiote from Cletus.

Venomized 
As the Poisons launch an all-out assault on the Marvel Universe, they are determined, since their last encounter with the alternate Carnage, not to leave such wildcard individuals which they designated as anomalies to be played against them. In that order, for his ability to summon monsters, they seek to consume Kid Kaiju while Thanos and his second-in-command, Doctor Doom send Black Cat and others to fetch Cletus Kasady, so they can separate him from his red symbiote and replace it with one of their own. However, what they find is a Cletus Kasady who is no longer bonded with Carnage.

As Thanos and Doctor Doom desperately want to bring Cletus into their hive, thereby making themselves stronger in the process, they discover for whatever reason, Cletus is resisting the symbiote bonding procedure. The bonding procedure is eventually a success and Carnage is consumed by a Poison. However, while he was consumed by a Poison, due to his mental instability, Cletus was able to resist being assimilated into the Poison Hive and his consciousness persisted, only pretended to be loyal to the Hive. He battled both Venom and Spider-Man, nearly taking the head of the former and impaling the latter. He was ultimately tossed into space by Venom and Danger, becoming one of the few Poisons to survive the death of the Poison Queen.

In the last page of Venom #8, a cult who worships Carnage, got hold of Cletus's damaged body inside a chamber and are planning to revive him by using the Grendel's remnants which they stole from Maker.

Absolute Carnage 

It is eventually revealed that Cletus returned from space because the Carnage symbiote was able to regenerate itself by destroying the Poison and then steered Cletus's body back to Earth. But despite its Darkhold-augmentations, Cletus's body was badly damaged and left him badly burnt but alive. After the cult dedicated to worshipping Knull, led by a corrupted Scorn, retrieved Cletus's body and stole a sample of the Grendel symbiote from the Maker's laboratory, they wanted to bond the Grendel symbiote to Cletus, so he could be psychically connected to Knull through the codex, trace remnants of Knull's leftover on the dragon's body. Cletus's body was restored when they successfully implanted the Grendel symbiote and escaped from the chamber resembling at first the Ancient Venom (Venom possessed by Knull), but this only lasted temporarily with Cletus ripping out Scorn's spine in order to consume the trace remnants of the Carnage symbiote leftover from her time as its host. Cletus decided to assume command of the cult and help free Knull, setting out to hunt down and consume the codexes of the other symbiote hosts, living and deceased.

After infecting some homeless people with his "Mind-Worms" to make them do his bidding, Cletus eventually reunites with Doppelganger and Shriek again and together reformed the cult with the citizens of Doverton who were infected by Carnage. They returned to Doverton and got the codexes from the citizens and animals by ripping all of their spines and turned John Jameson as their agent.

Kasady then impersonated Eddie Brock in order to discredit him and returned to Manhattan and allowed himself to be imprisoned in Ryker's Island. He was later confronted by Lee Price—who had formerly hosted the Venom symbiote and was currently the host of the Maniac symbiote– in the prison cafeteria and Kasady ripped the Mania symbiote out of him and absorbed it, destroying the security cameras in order to frame Brock for the ensuing slaughter.

After absorbing numerous other codices and the Mania symbiote, Cletus took the name of Dark Carnage, a thirteen-foot-tall skeletal monster with Knull's spiral on its forehead and a white dragon/spider emblem on his chest, and effectively became a demigod possessing power far beyond what a regular symbiote bestows its host, due to his connections to Chthon through the curse of the Darkhold and Knull through the Grendel symbiote. Again disguising himself as Eddie Brock, Dark Carnage snuck into the warehouse where Eddie, Spider-Man, and a number of other former symbiote hosts were hiding in to use a machine called the S.C.I.T.H.E., which could non-fatally remove codices. Approached by Spider-Man, who fell for his disguise, Cletus learned that Dylan Brock was Eddie's son. When the real Eddie arrived, accidentally revealing that Spider-Man was Peter Parker, Dark Carnage unveiled himself and summoned a horde of Carnage Doppelgangers to attack the warehouse. The Venom symbiote, tired of Eddie's refusal to kill, decided to bond with Bruce Banner, though Carnage killed him in the middle of it. However, as Dark Carnage had no idea who Banner was, he was shocked when the Devil Hulk resurrected his body and completed the bonding, delivering a powerful blow that he actually felt.

As they battled, Dark Carnage sensed the One Below All's power and wondered what would happen if he forced open the Green Door and merged it with Knull's eldritch darkness, though the Venomized Hulk rebuked his offer of an alliance. Stabbing tendrils into the Hulk's brain, Dark Carnage forced him to revert into Bruce Banner and then ripped the Venom symbiote off of him. Assimilating it, Dark Carnage transformed into an even more powerful form sporting black draconic horns, black pauldrons and arm-wraps resembling Knull's, and became able to transform his now-pointed back-protrusions into draconic wings. With the Grendel symbiote now powerful enough to free Knull from his prison, Dark Carnage took off; pursued by Eddie Brock, who had merged the codices harvested using the S.C.I.T.H.E. into a duplicate of the Venom symbiote.

As they fought in midair and on the rooftops, Dark Carnage gloated that he was on the cusp of victory and could see his horde about to kill Eddie's allies, telling Eddie to give up and let himself be consumed. Caught off-guard by the sudden arrival of Cloak, Dagger, Iron Fist, Firestar, Morbius, Deathlok, Captain Marvel, Deadpool, and Scream, Dark Carnage was tackled through the ground and into the tunnel where Dylan Brock and Normie Osborn were hiding. Snaring Dylan, Dark Carnage mockingly told Eddie that he had tricked him into claiming the remaining codices and that he now faced a decision in which both choices, of letting Dark Carnage kill Dylan or killing Dark Carnage to save Dylan, would lead to Knull reawakening. Manifesting a Necrosword from his symbiote, Eddie impaled Dark Carnage before cutting him in half, Cletus's corpse falling apart as the merged Grendel and Venom symbiotes left him for Eddie which also reawakened Knull in the process.

Ruins at Ravencroft 
It is revealed that Cletus' destiny to be one of Knull's hosts lies through his ancestor, Cortland during a colonial era. Cortland's downfall into a Knull worshipped serial killer was the reason behind Cletus' psychosis.

Powers and abilities

Other versions

Spider-Man and Batman: Disordered Minds 
Carnage teams up with the Joker and later turns against him during Spider-Man and Batman: Disordered Minds #1, the two men meeting when behavioral psychiatrist Cassandra Briar attempts to use the two men—regarded as humanity's most twisted minds—as tests for a chip she has developed that will allegedly 'lobotomize' their homicidal instincts. However, the Carnage symbiote neutralizes Kasady's chip after it is implanted, with Kasady simply pretending that the chip had worked so that he could meet the Joker. After Carnage removes Joker's chip, the two psychotics briefly enter into an alliance before their differing methods of murder cause a clash; Carnage favors numbers and actually seeing the death of his victims close-up in his murder sprees while the Joker prefers the artistry of his usual traps and tricks, Carnage dismissing the Joker's methods as slow while Joker sees Carnage as an amateur as anyone can just go out and kill people. Carnage responds by ambushing and threatening to kill Batman in order to be "theatrical". Carnage is defeated by Batman in the subsequent fight when he loses control of his symbiote while panicking after the Joker threatens to set off a bomb to destroy Gotham—himself and Carnage included—rather than see Carnage kill Batman. While defeating the shaken Kasady after his panic causes him to lose control of the symbiote, Batman reflects that many serial killers kill so many to try to escape death themselves by "appeasing" the Grim Reaper with their own sacrifices, and that Carnage—far from being a monster or even a "common street punk"—is little more than an overgrown "little boy", albeit with lethal powers.

Ultimate Marvel 
The Ultimate Marvel version of Cletus Kasady is alluded on a list of cat burglars on the Daily Bugle database.

Spider-Man: Heroes and Villains Collection 
Cletus Kasady appears in the series Spider-Man: Heroes and Villains Collection.

Marvel 1602

Marvel Mangaverse 
Cletus Kasady makes a few appearances in Marvel Mangaverse: Spider-Man.

In other media

Television
Cletus Kasady / Carnage appears in Spider-Man, voiced by Scott Cleverdon. In the episodes "Venom Returns" and "Carnage", Kasady is captured by the police after threatening to detonate a bomb in New York and becomes Eddie Brock's cellmate in prison. After the Venom symbiote infiltrates the prison, re-bonds with Brock, and escapes, Baron Mordo appears before Kasady, telling him of another symbiote and offers him its powers in exchange for serving Dormammu. Kasady accepts and bonds with the new symbiote, becoming Carnage before escaping as well. After receiving the ability to steal life energy so Dormammu can escape his dimension and consume the human dimension, Carnage abducts Ashley Kafka, leading to Brock and Venom joining forces with Spider-Man and Iron Man to save her. In the ensuing battle, Carnage tries to drag Kafka into Dormammu's realm with him, but Brock and Venom sacrifice themselves to save her and fall through the portal with Carnage to ensure Dormammu's defeat.
Cletus Kasady / Carnage appears in Spider-Man Unlimited (1999), voiced by Michael Donovan.
Cletus Kasady makes a non-speaking cameo appearance in The Spectacular Spider-Man episode "Reinforcement" as a patient of Ravencroft. Had the series continued, Kasady would have become Carnage.

Film

Cletus Kasady appears in films set in Sony's Spider-Man Universe, portrayed by Woody Harrelson. This version is a victim of extreme physical and psychological abuse dealt by his mother, father, and grandmother, the last of whom he eventually killed to escape the abuse, and became a serial killer because the media labeled him a monster and canonized his abusers. After being captured by authorities, he was placed on death row in San Quentin Prison after California's governor decided to end the state's moratorium on executions in light of the exceptionally horrific nature of Kasady's crimes.
Kasady first appears in a mid-credits scene for Venom, being interviewed by Eddie Brock in prison and promising "carnage" after his escape. Following the film's release, Harrelson has stated that Kasady will have a major role in the film's sequel (see below), having been unable to read its script until he signed on for the first film.
Kasady returns in Venom: Let There Be Carnage. While awaiting his execution, he is visited and interviewed again by Brock, who wants to learn the locations of his victims' bodies. Kasady quickly comes to see Brock as a kindred spirit and refuses to talk to anyone besides him. On the day of his execution by lethal injection, Kasady insults Brock, provoking Venom into attacking him, which allows Kasady to bite Brock's hand and absorb part of his symbiote. During his execution, a new symbiote surfaces inside Kasady, blocking the injection and granting him superhuman abilities, which he uses to break free and go on a violent rampage through the prison. The symbiote then introduces itself as Carnage and offers to help Kasady infiltrate Ravencroft Institute to liberate his childhood lover, Frances Barrison, in exchange for Kasady killing Brock and Venom. Kasady agrees, and together with Barrison, extends his rampage through all of San Francisco while capturing Patrick Mulligan and Anne Weying to lure out Brock and Venom. As Kasady and Barrison attempt to get married at a cathedral, Brock and Venom confront them. Seeing that Kasady and Carnage's bond is incomplete, Brock and Venom trick Barrison into attacking Kasady and Carnage with her sonic powers, which demolishes the cathedral, killing Barrison and separating Brock and Kasady from their respective symbiotes. After re-bonding with Brock, Venom devours Carnage and bites Kasady's head off.

Video games
Cletus Kasady / Carnage appears as a boss in The Amazing Spider-Man 2 (1992), Spider-Man/X-Men: Arcade's Revenge, The Amazing Spider-Man: Lethal Foes, Spider-Man and Venom: Maximum Carnage, and Venom/Spider-Man: Separation Anxiety.
Cletus Kasady / Carnage appears a boss in Spider-Man (2000), voiced by Dee Bradley Baker. He assists Doctor Octopus in a plot to launch a symbiote invasion using clones made from his symbiote until he is defeated by Spider-Man and the symbiote leaves Kasady to bond with Doc Ock.
Cletus Kasady / Carnage appears as a playable character in the PSP version of Spider-Man: Friend or Foe, voiced by Fred Tatasciore.
Cletus Kasady / Carnage appears as a playable character in the Nintendo DS, PS3, Xbox 360, PS4, Xbox One, and PC versions of Marvel: Ultimate Alliance 2. He also appears as a DLC character for the PS3 and Xbox 360 versions.
Cletus Kasady / Carnage appears as a playable character in Marvel Super Hero Squad Online.
Cletus Kasady / Carnage appears as a boss in Marvel: Avengers Alliance.
Cletus Kasady / Carnage appears as a team-up character in Marvel Heroes.
Cletus Kasady / Carnage appears as a playable character in Marvel Puzzle Quest.
Cletus Kasady / Carnage appears as a playable character in Lego Marvel Super Heroes. 
Cletus Kasady / Carnage appears as the final boss of The Amazing Spider-Man 2 (2014), voiced by David Agranov. This version is a serial killer nicknamed the "Carnage Killer" who murders other criminals and sees Spider-Man as a kindred spirit. It is later revealed that Kasady was released from prison by Wilson Fisk to terrorize New York's citizens so that they will support his plans to redevelop the city, though Fisk was forced to call in Kraven the Hunter to deal with Kasady after he goes too far with his killings. Spider-Man and Kraven work together to track down and defeat Kasady, leading to his arrest. After being sent to Ravencroft, Fisk funds an experiment to have Kasady injected with a symbiote-esque, nanite-based serum called "Venom". Once he gains control of it, Kasady escapes and infects others with it. After learning about the symbiote's weaknesses, Spider-Man defeats Kasady and removes his symbiote before ensuring he is re-incarcerated.
Cletus Kasady / Carnage appears as a playable character and boss in Spider-Man Unlimited (2014).
Cletus Kasady / Carnage appears as a playable character in Marvel: Contest of Champions.
Cletus Kasady / Carnage appears as a playable character in Marvel: Future Fight.
Cletus Kasady / Carnage appears as a playable character in Lego Marvel Super Heroes 2. In the story mode, Green Goblin 2099 uses a shard of the Nexus of All Realities to fuse Venom and Carnage into a new creature he can control that Spider-Man dubs "Carnom".
Cletus Kasady / Carnage appears as a playable character in Marvel Strike Force.

Miscellaneous
Cletus Kasady / Carnage appears in the Broadway musical Spider-Man: Turn Off the Dark, played by Collin Baja. This version is a member of the Sinister Six and was originally an Oscorp scientist who the Green Goblin manipulated into becoming a supervillain.

References

External links 

Carnage Checklist at thevenomsite.com

Cletus Kasady at Comic Vine
Cletus Kasady at Spider-Man Wiki

Characters created by David Michelinie
Characters created by Erik Larsen
Characters created by Mark Bagley
Comics characters introduced in 1992
Fictional cannibals
Fictional characters who committed familicide
Fictional cult leaders
Fictional mass murderers
Fictional nihilists
Fictional prison escapees
Fictional rampage and spree killers
Fictional serial killers
Fictional torturers
Marvel Comics characters with superhuman strength
Marvel Comics characters who can move at superhuman speeds
Marvel Comics film characters
Marvel Comics male supervillains
Marvel Comics orphans
Marvel Comics supervillains
Merged fictional characters
Spider-Man characters